The 2021–22 CSA Provincial T20 Knock-Out was a Twenty20 cricket tournament that was played in South Africa in September and October 2021. It was the first Twenty20 tournament to be played in the country since Cricket South Africa restructured its domestic setup, and featured all fifteen provincial sides and the national under-19 team.

From Pool A, South Western Districts and Western Province both advanced to the play-offs. In Group B, Knights and Titans finished first and second respectively to qualify. Group D saw Boland and Warriors reach the play-offs. The final group matches were played in Group C, with  Dolphins and North West completing the line-up for the play-off stage.

On the first day of the quarter-finals, Titans beat South Western Districts by 54 runs, and Knights beat Western Province by four runs. In the first semi-final, Dolphins beat Titans by four wickets. The second semi-final finished as no result due to rain, with Knights advancing to the final due to have a better run rate throughout the tournament. In the final, Knights beat Dolphins by seven runs to win their first domestic title in ten years.

Teams
The teams were placed into the following groups:

 Pool A: Lions, Northern Cape, South Western Districts, Western Province
 Pool B: Knights, KwaZulu-Natal Inland, Mpumalanga, Titans
 Pool C:  Dolphins, Easterns, North West, South Africa Under-19s
 Pool D: Boland, Border, Limpopo, Warriors

Fixtures

Pool A

Pool B

Pool C

Pool D

Play-offs

Bracket

Quarter-finals

Semi-finals

Final

References

External links
 Series home at ESPN Cricinfo

South African domestic cricket competitions
CSA Provincial T20 Knock-Out
2021–22 South African cricket season